Naharudin Bin Mahayudin (born ) is a Malaysian male weightlifter, competing in the 62 kg category and representing Malaysia at international competitions. He competed at world championships, most recently at the 2007 World Weightlifting Championships.

Major results

References

1984 births
Living people
Malaysian male weightlifters
Place of birth missing (living people)
Weightlifters at the 2006 Commonwealth Games
Weightlifters at the 2010 Commonwealth Games
Commonwealth Games medallists in weightlifting
Commonwealth Games silver medallists for Malaysia
20th-century Malaysian people
21st-century Malaysian people
Medallists at the 2010 Commonwealth Games